"NFPA 704: Standard System for the Identification of the Hazards of Materials for Emergency Response" is a standard maintained by the U.S.-based National Fire Protection Association. First "tentatively adopted as a guide" in 1960, and revised several times since then, it defines the "Safety Square" or  "Fire Diamond" which is used by emergency personnel to quickly and easily identify the risks posed by hazardous materials. This helps determine what, if any, special equipment should be used, procedures followed, or precautions taken during the initial stages of an emergency response. It is an internationally accepted safety standard, and is crucial while transporting chemicals.

Codes

The four divisions are typically color-coded with red on top indicating flammability, blue on the left indicating level of health hazard, yellow on the right for chemical reactivity, and white containing codes for special hazards. Each of health, flammability and reactivity is rated on a scale from 0 (no hazard) to 4 (severe hazard). The latest version of NFPA 704 sections 5, 6, 7 and 8 for the specifications of each classification are listed below. The numeric values in the first column are designated in the standard by "Degree of Hazard" using Arabic numerals (0, 1, 2, 3, 4), not to be confused with other classification systems, such as that in the NFPA 30 Flammable and Combustible Liquids Code, where flammable and combustible liquid categories are designated by "Class", using Roman numerals (I, II, III).

History 
The development of NFPA 704 is credited to the Charlotte Fire Department after a fire at the Charlotte Chemical Company in 1959 led to severe injuries to many of the firefighters. Upon arrival, the fire crew found a fire burning inside a vat that firefighters assumed to be burning kerosene. The crew tried to suppress the fire, which resulted in the vat exploding due to metallic sodium being stored in the kerosene. Thirteen firefighters were injured, including several of whom had critical injuries and one who lost both ears and most of his face from the incident.

At the time, such vats were not labelled with the materials they contained, so firefighters didn't have the necessary information to recognize that hazardous materials were present, which required a specific response. In this case, sodium was able to react with water to release hydrogen gas and large amounts of heat, which has the potential to explode. 

The Charlotte Fire Department developed training to respond to fires involving hazardous materials, ensured that protective clothing was available to those responding, and expanded the fire prevention inspection program. Fire Marshal J. F. Morris developed the diamond shaped placard as a marking system to indicate when a building contained hazardous materials, with their levels of flammability, reactivity and health effects.

See also 

 Globally Harmonized System of Classification and Labeling of Chemicals
 Hazard symbol
 HMIS Color Bar
 Hazchem
 Hazmat

References

External links 

 
 
 
 

NFPA Standards
Safety codes